Jansenia rugosiceps is a species of tiger beetle found in southern India. They are found mainly on rocks and boulders on hills in scrub forest. They measure  in length. An examination of pygidial gland chemical defenses found that the species does not produce significant benzaldehyde unlike many other tiger beetle species.

References

External links 
 Image

Cicindelidae
Beetles of Asia
Endemic arthropods of India
Taxa named by Maximilien Chaudoir
Beetles described in 1865